Donald Wood-Smith, MD, FACS, FRCS is a Professor of Clinical Surgery at Columbia University College of Physicians and Surgeons, and an Attending Surgeon at NewYork-Presbyterian Hospital/Columbia University Medical Center. He is also Chairman of the Department of Plastic and Reconstructive Surgery at the New York Eye and Ear Infirmary.

Wood-Smith was born in Sydney, Australia and educated at Newington College (1944–1947), the University of Sydney Medical School and the Royal College of Surgeons in Edinburgh, Scotland. He then was a resident at NYU Langone Medical Center and Manhattan Eye, Ear and Throat Hospital and as a fellow at Bellevue Hospital and Santa Clara Valley Medical Center.

Wood-Smith has often been quoted in the press on issues related to cosmetic and reconstructive surgery.

Publications & Articles
Cosmetic Facial Surgery. Rees TD & Wood-Smith D.  W.B. Saunders Company, 1973. 
Nursing Care of the Plastic Surgery Patient. Wood-Smith D & Porowski P. C.V. Mosby, 1970. 
Reconstructive Plastic Surgery. Converse JM (Ed.). W.B. Sanders Company, 1997. (Wrote multiple chapters).
Plastic Surgery. McCarthy JG (Ed.). W.B. Sanders Company, 1990. (Wrote multiple chapters).
Wider TM, Schwartz TH, Carmel PW, Wood-Smith D. Internal brain herniation in a patient with Apert's syndrome. Ann Plast Surg. 1995;34(4):420-3.
Wood-Smith D, Ascherman JA, Albom MJ. Reconstruction of acquired ear defects with transauricular flaps. Plast Reconstr Surg. 1995;95(1):173-5.
Masoud Saman, Jason Gross, Alex Ovchinsky, Donald Wood-Smith. Cleft lip and palate in the arts: a critical reflection. Cleft Palate Craniofac J. 2012;49(2):129-36.
Wood-Smith D, Dixit S. Reconstruction of agenesis of the external nose secondary to congenital hypertelorism. Clin Plast Surg. 1981;8(3):615-8.
Coccaro PJ, McCarthy JG, Epstein FJ, Wood-Smith D, Converse JM. Early and late surgery in craniofacial dysostosis – A longitudinal cephalometric study. Am J Orthod. 1980;77(4):421-36.
Wood-Smith D, Epstein F, Morello D. Transcranial decompression of the optic nerve in the osseous canal in Crouzon's disease. Clin Plast Surg. 1976;3(4):621-3.
Wood-Smith D. History of plastic and reconstructive surgery. J Dermatol Surg. 1975;1(1):45-6.
Converse JM, McCarthy JG, Wood-Smith D. Orbital hypotelorism pathogenesis associated facio-cerebral anomalies, surgical correction. Plast Reconstr Surg. 1975;56(4):389-94.
Epstein F, Wood-Smith D, Converse JM, Benjamin MV, Becker MH, Ronsohoff J. Radical one-stage correction of craniofacial anomalies. J Neurosurg. 1975;42(5):522-9.
Converse JJ, Wood-Smith D, McCarthy JG. Report on a series of 50 craniofacial operations. Plast Reconstr Surg. 1975;55(3):283-93.
Converse JM, Smith B, Wood-Smith D. Deformities of the midface resulting from malunited orbital and naso-orbital fractures. Clin Plast Surg. 1975;2(1):107-30.
Epstein F, Ransohoff J, Wood-Smith D, Converse JM. Correction of ocular hypertelorism. Child's Brain 1975;1(4):228-35.
Converse JM, Wood-Smith D, McCarthy JG, Coccaro PJ, Becker MH. Bilateral facial microsomia – Diagnosis, classification, treatment. Plast Reconstr Surg. 1974;54(4):413-23.
Wood-Smith D, Dey DL. Australian experience in craniofacial osteotomy for facial deformity. Aust N Z J Surg. 1974;44(4):382-7.
Bernard RW, Casson PR, Wood-Smith D, Converse JM. Dental disease – Cutaneous manifestations. N Y State J Med. 1974;74(9):1612-4.
Converse JM, Wood-Smith D, McCarthy JG, Coccaro PJ. Craniofacial surgery. N Y Clin Plast Surg. 1974;1(3):499-557.
Converse JM, Coccaro PJ, Wood-Smith D. Hemifacial microsomia (dysostosis otomandibularis). Fortschr Kiefer Gesichtschir. 1974;18:53-63.
Converse JJ, Firmin F, Wood-Smith D, Friedland JA. Clinical Note: The conjunctival approach in orbital fractures. Plast Reconstr Surg. 1973;52(6):656-7.
Converse JJ, Wood-Smith D. Craniofacial surgery for ocular hypertelorism and craniofacial stenosis. Trans. Amer Acad Ophthalmol & Otolaryngol 1973;77(5):352-67.
Converse JM, Horowitz SL, Coccaro PJ, Wood-Smith D. The corrective treatment of the skeletal asymmetry in hemifacial microsomia. Plast Reconstr Surg. 1973;52(3):221-32.
Converse JM, Coccaro PJ, Becker M, Wood-Smith D. On hemifacial microsomia – The first and second branchial arch syndrome. Plast Reconstr Surg. 1973;51(3):268-79.
Converse JM, Wood-Smith D. A new technique for the correction of orbital hypertelorism. Laryngoscope 1972;82(8):1455-62.
Wood-Smith D, Converse JM. The lop ear deformity. Surg Clin North Am. 1971;51(2):417-27.
Rees TD, Krupp S, Wood-Smith D. Secondary rhinoplasty. Plast Reconstr Surg. 1970;46(4):332-40.
Briggs RM, Wood-Smith D. A simple technique for intermaxillary fixation – Rapid simple immobilization of the mandible. Surg Gynecol Obstet. 1969;129(6):1270-4.
Rees TD, Wood-Smith D, Converse JM. Electromyographic evaluation of submucous cleft palate – a possible aid to operative planning. Plast Reconstr Surg. 1967;40(6):592-4.
Converse JM, Smith B, Obear MF, Wood-Smith D. Orbital blowout fractures – A ten-year survey. Plast Reconstr Surg. 1967;39(1):20-36.

References

External links
Dr. Donald Wood-Smith at Columbia University Department of Surgery
Donald Wood-Smith
New York Magazine's 2004 Best Doctors in New York
Donald Wood-Smith

Living people
American plastic surgeons
Australian plastic surgeons
Medical educators
Columbia University faculty
Columbia Medical School faculty
People educated at Newington College
Fellows of the American College of Surgeons
Fellows of the Royal College of Surgeons of Edinburgh
Year of birth missing (living people)